The Resolute Beneficial Society, established in 1818, was a Washington DC organization founded by free African Americans. The society supported health, education, and burial needs of Washington D.C.'s Black community.

History 
The Society was organized by George Bell, John W. Prout, John F. Cook, Sr., James Harris, Rev. Stepney Forrest and others.

References 

1818 establishments in the United States
African-American history of Washington, D.C.